Hof is a former municipality in Vestfold county, Norway.  It merged into Holmestrand on Jan. 1, 2018.  The administrative centre of the former municipality was the village of Hof.  The municipality of Hof was established on 1 January 1838 (see formannskapsdistrikt).  Hof had 3,031 inhabitants as of 1 January 2002.

General information

Name 
The municipality (originally the parish) was named after the old Hof farm (Old Norse: Hof), since the first church was built here. The name is identical with the word hof which means "pagan temple (for the Norse Gods)".

Coat-of-arms 
The coat-of-arms is from modern times.  They were granted on 17 July 1992.  The arms show three gold-colored water lily leaves on a red background.  This was chosen to represent the many small lakes in the municipality.  There are three to represent the three church parishes in the municipality.  It was designed by Geir Helgen from Buskerud.

Geography 
It consists of the three parishes of Hof, Eidsfoss, and Sundbyfoss. The highest point in Vestfold, Skibergfjell, is located in the northern part of Hof municipality, close to Eidsfoss. Skibergfjell is 632 metres (2,073 ft).

Economy 
Hof is a typical agricultural and forestry community and its largest industry is a lumber mill. Hof lies in the climate zone best suited for agriculture in Norway. Therefore, wheat is one of the most important agricultural products of the municipality. However, between 1998 and 2008, 40% of the municipality's farms have become inactive, and the agriculture employment rate has dropped to 5,3%. Within the next 10 to 20 years an increased utilization of the municipality's forests is expected (stated August 2008).

Hof is known for its great hunting and fishing resources.  of forest are open for hunting. The hunting is commercialized. About 75 landowners are united in a land owner union (Hof Utmarkslag), and hunters must purchase permits from them (mainly small game hunting).

Annual rates of felled game (2007):
Moose: >100
Red deer: 1–5
Roe deer: 80–90
Beaver: 0–10

See also 
Grøntjernkollen

References

External links 
 
 
 Municipal fact sheet from Statistics Norway
 
 Hofnett 
 Eidsfoss 
 Visiteidsfoss 
 Hofposten 
 Vestfoldnett 
 Eikeren 

 
Holmestrand
Villages in Vestfold og Telemark